Portal frame is a construction technique where vertical supports are connected to horizontal beams or trusses via fixed joints with designed-in  moment-resisting capacity. The result is wide spans and open floors.

Portal frame structures can be constructed using a variety of materials and methods. These include steel, reinforced concrete and laminated timber such as glulam. First developed in the 1960s, they have become the most common form of enclosure for spans of 20 to 60 meters.

Because of these very strong and rigid joints, some of the bending moment in the rafters is transferred to the columns.  This means that the size of the rafters can be reduced or the span can be increased for the same size rafters. This makes portal frames a very efficient construction technique to use for wide span buildings.

Portal frame construction is therefore typically seen in warehouses, barns and other places where large, open spaces are required at low cost and a pitched roof is acceptable.

Generally portal frames are used for single-story buildings but they can be used for low-rise buildings with several floors where they can be economic if the floors do not span right across the building (in these circumstances a skeleton frame, with internal columns, would be a more economic choice). A typical configuration might be where there is office space built against one wall of a warehouse.

Portal frames can be clad with various materials. For reasons of economy and speed, the most popular solution is some form of lightweight insulated metal cladding with cavity masonry work to the bottom 2m of the wall to provide security and impact resistance.  The lightweight cladding would be carried on sheeting rails spanning between the columns of the portal frames.

Portal frames can be defined as two-dimensional rigid frames that have the basic characteristics of a rigid joint between column and beam.

The main objective of this form of design is to reduce bending moment in the beam, which allows the frame to act as one structural unit.

The transfer of stresses from the beam to the column results in rotational movement at the foundation, which can be overcome by the introduction of a pin/hinge joint.

For warehouses and industrial buildings, sloping roof made of purlins and ac sheet roofing between portals is provided. For assembly halls, portals with R.C slab roof cast monolithically is used.

Portal frames are designed for the following loads:
roof load
wind load
Previously, it has been shown that the limit state design/load and resistance factor design (LRFD) and permissible stress design/allowable strength design (ASD) can produce significantly different designs of steel gable frames.

There are few situations where ASD produces significantly lighter weight steel gable frame designs. Additionally, it has been shown that in high snow regions, the difference between the methods is more dramatic.

While designing, care should be taken for proper
joints
foundation
bracing

If the joints are not rigid, they will "open up" and the frame will be unstable when subjected to loads. This is the pack of cards effect.
Vertical loading results in the walls being pushed outwards. If the foundation cannot resist horizontal push, outward movement will occur and the frame will lose strength.
Wind subjects the frame to uplift forces. Overturning forces on the sides and ends of the building. Drag forces on the roof and sides.
These destabilizing forces are resisted essentially by the weight of the building and in this regard, the foundations contribute significantly to this weight. The foundations are regarded as the building's anchors.

Types of Portal Frame

Portal frames are a common type of structural framing system used in construction. There are several types of portal frames, including:

Single span portal frame: This is the simplest form of a portal frame, consisting of two vertical columns and a horizontal beam spanning between them.

Multi-span portal frame: A multi-span portal frame consists of several single span portal frames connected together with intermediate columns.

Propped portal frame: In a propped portal frame, one end of the beam is supported by a column, while the other end is free to move.

Tied portal frame: A tied portal frame is similar to a propped portal frame, but both ends of the beam are tied to the columns, providing additional stability.

Pitched roof portal frame: This type of portal frame is designed to support a pitched roof, with the columns and beams angled to match the slope of the roof.

Curved portal frame: A curved portal frame is used when a curved roof or structure is required. The curved beams are typically made of steel or laminated timber.

Skewed portal frame: A skewed portal frame is used when the columns and beams are not perpendicular to each other, often used for irregular shaped buildings.

The choice of portal frame type depends on the requirements of the building design, the load-bearing capacity required, and the materials used.

References

Structural system